Krnja Jela may refer to:

 Krnja Jela, Bosanski Petrovac, a village in the municipality of Bosanski Petrovac, Bosnia and Herzegovina
 , a village in the municipality of Šavnik, Montenegro
 Krnja Jela (Sjenica), a village in the municipality of Sjenica, Serbia

See also 

 Krna Jela, a village in the municipality of Foča, Bosnia and Herzegovina